Vladimir Grigoryevich Stolnikov (12 March 1934 – 30 March 1990) was a Russian amateur flyweight boxer who won two medals at the European championships in 1959 and 1961. He competed at the 1956 Summer Olympics, but lost in the third bout to the eventual winner Terence Spinks.

Stolnikov took up boxing at the age 14 and won the national flyweight title in 1955 and 1957-58. He retired in 1961 with a record of 161 wins out of 186 bouts.

1956 Olympic results
Below are the results of Vladimir Stolnikov, a flyweight boxer from the Soviet union who competed at the 1956 Melbourne Olympics:

 Round of 32: defeated Edgar Basel (West Germany) on points
 Round of 16: defeated Salvatore Burruni (Italy) on points
 Quarterfinal: lost to Terrence Spinks (Great Britain) on points

References

1934 births
1990 deaths
Boxers at the 1956 Summer Olympics
Olympic boxers of the Soviet Union
Soviet male boxers
Sportspeople from Saint Petersburg
Flyweight boxers